María de Córdoba (1597–1678), was a Spanish stage actress, known as Amarilis la bella and la sultana Amarilis. She was a famous and popular diva of her era. She was celebrated in poems, songs and writings by artists such as Pedro de Morales, Guillen de Castro and Francisco de Quevedo, and also involved in conflicts with members of the nobility because of her position as a favorite artist of the royal court.

References
 Cotarelo y Mori, Emilio (1933). Ayuntamiento de Madrid, ed. Actores famosos del siglo XVII. María de Córdoba «Amarilis» y su marido Andrés de la Vega (Revista de la Biblioteca, Archivo y Museo del Ayuntamiento de Madrid edición). Madrid. pp. 1–33. Consultado el febrero de 2015.

1597 births
1678 deaths
17th-century Spanish actresses